The 1960 World 600 was the inaugural running of the World 600, a NASCAR Grand National Series event. It was run on June 19, 1960 at the Charlotte Motor Speedway in Concord, North Carolina. It was NASCAR's first 600-mile race and it was the longest NASCAR race distance. Joe Lee Johnson was the winner of the inaugural race.

Background

Charlotte Motor Speedway is a motorsports complex located in Concord, North Carolina, thirteen miles from Charlotte, North Carolina. The track is a  asphalt quad-oval track that hosts NASCAR racing including the World 600 and the National 400. The speedway broke ground in 1958 with Bruton Smith and Curtis Turner as the architects. Charlotte Motor Speedway is now operated by Speedway Motorsports.

Race report
The race was postponed for three weeks because of construction delays. During the race, Don O'Dell's Pontiac crashed into the driver's door of Lenny Page's Chevy. Lenny Page, who was lucky to survive the crash due to the safety systems at that time, was near death afterward, but reporter Chris Economaki rushed to the scene and aided Page with CPR until safety crews arrived. He was later credited with saving Lenny's life.

Cars were allowed to run dirt track style screens to protect the radiators from debris, as officials were aware of the problem before the race started. This is the only time a father and son have been disqualified in the same race. This was the last time the #89 has won in the Cup Series.

Ed Markstellar and Japanese-American driver George Tet would make their stock car debuts in this race while Jim Austin, Arnold Gardner and Gene Marmor would make their finale. Johnny Wolford would run his only NASCAR Cup Series race here. Rex White would take away the championship lead from Richard Petty with his sixth-place finish as opposed to Petty finishing in 55th place due to a disqualification. Petty and five other drivers (Lee Petty, Bob Welborn, Paul Lewis, Junior Johnson, and Lenny Page) were all disqualified for making illegal entrances to pit road.

Notable crew chiefs included Louis Clements, Bud Allman, Ray Fox, Shorty Johns, Bud Moore, Mario Rossi, Dale Swanson and Paul McDuffie.

Results

Timeline
Section reference: 
 Start of race: Fireball Roberts officially started with race with the pole position.
 Lap 5: Johnny Walford had a terminal crash.
 Lap 6: Cotton Owens and Johnny Allen were involved in a terminal crash.
 Lap 27: Ed Markstellar was involved in a terminal crash.
 Lap 66: Tom Pistone took over the lead from Fireball Roberts.
 Lap 74: Junior Johnson took over the lead from Tom Pistone.
 Lap 79: Curtis Turner took over the lead from Junior Johnson.
 Lap 85: Joe Weatherly had a terminal crash.
 Lap 95: Jack Smith took over the lead from Curtis Turner.
 Lap 97: Fireball Roberts took over the lead from Jack Smith.
 Lap 138: Herb Tillman had a terminal crash.
 Lap 141: Jack Smith took over the lead from Fireball Roberts.
 Lap 144: Fireball Roberts took over the lead from Jack Smith.
 Lap 149: Curtis Turner took over the lead from Fireball Roberts.
 Lap 154: Tom Pistone took over the lead from Curtis Turner.
 Lap 160: Jack Smith took over the lead from Tom Pistone.
 Lap 176: Doug Yates and Roy Tyner were involved in a terminal crash.
 Lap 233: Ned Jarrett had a terminal crash.
 Lap 246: Jim Reed had a terminal crash.
 Lap 333: Transmission problems would sideline Jimmy Massey on this lap.
 Lap 341: Problems with his vehicle's frame would take Marvin Panch out of the race.
 Lap 352: Jack Smith would experience problems with his vehicle's fuel tank.
 Lap 353: Joe Lee Johnson took over the lead from Jack Smith.
 Lap 365: Charley Griffith blew his vehicle's engine while driving at high speeds.
 Finish: Joe Lee Johnson was officially declared the winner of the event.

Race Statistics
Section reference: 
 Time of race: 5:34:06
 Average Speed: 
 Pole Speed: 
 Cautions: 8 for 45 laps
 Margin of Victory: 4 laps +
 Lead changes: 11

References

World 600
NC State Wolf North Carolina
NASCAR races at Charlotte Motor Speedway
World 600